This is a list of past and present programs broadcast by the Canadian television channels TSN and TSN 2.

Present

#
30 for 30

A-E
Around the Horn
CFL on TSN
CFL Wired
Curling on TSN
Engraved on a Nation

F-J
First Take
Golf Talk Canada
Highly Questionable

K-O
Leafs Lunch
MLS on TSN
Monday Night Football
Motoring
NASCAR Canadian Tire Series
NBA: The Jump
Open Gym
Outside the Lines
OverDrive

P-T
Pardon the Interruption
Rogers Cup
SC with Jay and Dan
Season of Champions on TSN
SportsCentre
That's Hockey
That's Hockey 2Nite
Toronto Raptors on TSN
TSN Hockey
TSN Skins Game

U-Z
Wednesday Night Hockey
WNBA on TSN
X Games, both summer and winter

Past

#

A-E
American Wrestling Association

F-J
Friday Night Fights

K-O
Off the Record with Michael Landsberg

P-T
Pro Wrestling Plus
Stampede Wrestling

U-Z
WCW Monday Nitro
WWE Raw

See also
The Sports Network

External links
TSN website

Lists of television series by network